Harrisburg Run is a  long first-order tributary to Foster Brook.  This is the only stream of this name in the United States.

Course

Watershed

See also 
 List of rivers of Pennsylvania
 List of rivers of New York

References

Rivers of Pennsylvania
Rivers of New York (state)
Tributaries of the Allegheny River
Rivers of McKean County, Pennsylvania
Rivers of Cattaraugus County, New York